Tempa is an unincorporated community in Summers County, West Virginia, United States. Tempa is northwest of Hinton and east of Alderson.

The community probably derives its name from the Vale of Tempe, in Greece.

References

Unincorporated communities in Summers County, West Virginia
Unincorporated communities in West Virginia